Mathieu Jean Hubert Grosch (born 14 September 1950, in Eupen) is a Belgian politician and Member of the European Parliament for the German-speaking Community of Belgium with the CSP-EVP, Member of the Bureau of the European People's Party and sits on the European Parliament's Committee on Transport and Tourism.

He is a substitute for the Committee on Regional Development, a member of the Delegation to the EU-Mexico Joint Parliamentary Committee and a substitute for the Delegation for relations with Japan.

Education 
1973: Germanic languages, University of Liège
1974: Accredited upper school teacher

Career 
1974–1981: teacher of English and German
1986–present: Member of the national bureau of the CSP
1994–present: Member of the EPP bureau
1981–1984: Adviser to the Prime Minister
1984–1985: Member of the provincial council
1986–1994: Member of Council, German-speaking Community
1986–1990: Government minister, German-speaking Community
1990–1994: Chairman of Council, German-speaking Community
1991–2012: Mayor of Kelmis
1994–2014: Member of the European Parliament
Member of the Robert Schuman Foundation
1996–present: Member of the board of Bierset-Liège airport

Decorations
1999: Merit award of the Meuse-Rhine Euregio
1999: Commander of the Order of Leopold (Belgium)
2004: Order of Merit of the Federal Republic of Germany, First Class

External links
Mathieu Grosch's official webpage

1950 births
Living people
People from Eupen
University of Liège alumni

Officers Crosses of the Order of Merit of the Federal Republic of Germany
Christlich Soziale Partei (Belgium) MEPs
German-speaking Community of Belgium
MEPs for Belgium 1994–1999
MEPs for Belgium 1999–2004
MEPs for Belgium 2004–2009
MEPs for Belgium 2009–2014